is a Japanese former voice actress and singer. On April 29 of 2018, she announced her indefinite hiatus from the voice acting industry.

Notable voice roles
Akihabara Dennou Gumi - Hibari Hinakoganei
Gate Keepers - Yasue Okamori
Happy Lesson - Fumitsuki Nanakorobi
Kaleido Star - Macquarie
Magical Play - Pipin
Super GALS! Kotobuki Ran - Rie

External links
 
 

1972 births
Living people
Japanese voice actresses